Ville Lajunen (born 8 March 1988) is a Finnish professional ice hockey defenceman who currently plays for Schwenninger Wild Wings in the Deutsche Eishockey Liga (DEL).

Playing career
Born in Helsinki, Lajunen played as a youth within the Espoo Blues program of the SM-liiga.  While playing professionally for the Blues, he led the SM-liiga in assists (32) by a defenseman in the 2009–10 season.

On 18 November 2011, Lajunen left Espoo during the final year of his contract to join Metallurg Magnitogorsk in the KHL.

On 24 May 2017, Lajunen signed a one-year contract with HC Spartak Moscow of the KHL. After posting 26 points in 52 games from the blueline in the 2017–18 season, Lajunen left Spartak but continued in the KHL, agreeing to terms on a one-year contract with Chinese outfit, Kunlun Red Star, on 31 May 2018.

In the 2018–19 season, Lajunen was a steadying influence with Kunlun, contributing with 10 goals and 27 points in 56 regular season games. As a free agent at the conclusion of his contract, Lajunen left China, signing a one-year contract with HC Vityaz to remain in the KHL on 2 May 2019.

On 24 June 2022, Lajunen left HC TPS of the Liiga after two seasons and signed a one-year contract with German club, Schwenninger Wild Wings of the DEL, for the 2022–23 season.

Career statistics

Regular season and playoffs

International

References

External links

1988 births
Living people
Espoo Blues players
Färjestad BK players
Finnish ice hockey defencemen
Finnish expatriate ice hockey players in China
Finnish expatriate ice hockey players in Sweden
Finnish expatriate ice hockey players in Russia
Jokerit players
KooKoo players
HC Kunlun Red Star players
Metallurg Magnitogorsk players
Schwenninger Wild Wings players
HC Spartak Moscow players
Ice hockey people from Helsinki
HC TPS players
HC Vityaz players